The Hovden Cannery in Cannery Row, Monterey, California, was among the oldest, largest canneries of the Pacific Sardine Fishery. In the first half of the 20th century, it marked one of the most lucrative national fisheries. It was a source for literary inspiration in the works of John Steinbeck.

Hovden Cannery was founded in 1916 by Knut Hovden, a leading innovator in canning technology, and closed in 1973 after the collapse of the area fish population.

The former cannery building is now the site of the Monterey Bay Aquarium, which opened in 1984.

References

External links

Seafood canneries
Buildings and structures in Monterey, California
Historic American Engineering Record in California
Monterey Bay
Monterey Bay Aquarium
Companies based in Monterey County, California
Defunct companies based in California
Food and drink companies established in 1916
Food and drink companies disestablished in 1973
1916 establishments in California
1973 disestablishments in California
American companies disestablished in 1973